David Fierro is an American stage, TV and film actor and director. He is known for the roles of Inspector Jacob Speight on The Knick and roles on Red Oaks and Gotham.

Biography 
Fierro's most notable role has been Jacob Speight in the Cinemax television series The Knick. In 2019, he portrayed Mayor Buddy Gray in the pilot for the CBS crime drama series Tommy, but was replaced by actor Thomas Sadoski before the series was picked up by the network. He is the son of musician Martin Fierro.

Filmography

References

External links 
 

Living people
Year of birth missing (living people)
American male actors
American television directors
Columbia University School of the Arts alumni
Male actors from New York City
Date of birth missing (living people)